Diba Chandra Hrangkhawl is a politician from Tripura, India. In 2013 assembly elections, he represented Karmachhara constituency in Unakoti district in Tripura Legislative Assembly.

In 2016, he was one of the six MLAs from Indian National Congress who joined All India Trinamool Congress, due to unhappiness with party because of allying Communist Party of India (Marxist) in 2016 West Bengal Legislative Assembly election.

In August 2017, he was one of the six MLAs from All India Trinamool Congress who joined Bharatiya Janata Party after they cross voted against the party lines in 2017 Indian presidential election.

References

People from Unakoti district
Living people
Tripura politicians
Indian National Congress politicians
Trinamool Congress politicians
Bharatiya Janata Party politicians from Tripura
Tripura MLAs 2018–2023
1956 births